MS Victoria I has been chartered by the Scottish Government to provide temporary accommodation to those fleeing the war in Ukraine.  The vessel is docked in the port of Leith, in Edinburgh.  The ship, which has been chartered until January 2023 and will provide people with accommodation until they secure somewhere to stay longer term, took in its first Ukrainian residents in July 2022.

The Victoria I was formerly a cruiseferry operated by the Estonian ferry company Tallink on a route connecting Stockholm, Sweden to Tallinn, Estonia via Mariehamn, Finland. She was built in 2004 by Aker Finnyards, Rauma. Although the ship's official name is Victoria I, she is often referred to as Victoria, without the number. This is also the name displayed on top of her superstructure, whereas the name is written in full form on the hull.

Between 18 November and 20 November 2005 the Victoria I made two one-day cruises from Helsinki to Tallinn, the latter of which was a re-election campaign cruise for the Finnish president Tarja Halonen. The use of an Estonian-flagged ship by the president provoked protests from the Finnish Seamen's Union.

The Victoria'''s sister ship, the ferry Romantika'' has been chartered by Holland Norway Lines to operate a new route between Kristiansand in Norway and Eemshaven in Netherlands.

See also
Largest ferries of Europe

References

External links

 Tallink silja website for MS Victoria
 MS Victoria I at Fakta om Fartyg 
 Victoria I at marinetraffic.com

Ferries of Estonia
Ships built in Rauma, Finland
Cruiseferries
2003 ships